Jeroen van den Broeck (16 February 1989 – 23 November 2017) was a Belgian footballer who last played for OG Vorselaar in his home country.

Career

Van den Broeck started his senior career with A.S. Verbroedering Geel. In 2008, he signed for AGOVV Apeldoorn in the Dutch Eerste Divisie, where he made five appearances and scored zero goals.

References

External links 
 “Wat een heerlijke tijd” (Archived) 
 “Prachtige herinneringen aan Glasgow Rangers” 
 “Prachtige herinneringen aan Glasgow Rangers” (Archived) 
 Gazet van Antwerpen Tag 
 ‘Houtvenne moet altijd voor de prijzen meedoen’ 
 “Deze zege is voor Jeroen Van Den Broeck” 
 at Soccerway

1989 births
2017 deaths
AS Verbroedering Geel players
Association football midfielders
Belgian footballers
Rangers F.C. players
Association football defenders
Belgian expatriate footballers
Expatriate footballers in Scotland
Expatriate footballers in the Netherlands
AGOVV Apeldoorn players
Hoogstraten VV players